DESI may refer to 
 Desorption electrospray ionization
 Drug Efficacy Study Implementation
 Dark Energy Spectroscopic Instrument

See also
 Desi (disambiguation)